Rongorongo is a system of glyphs discovered in the 19th century on Easter Island that appears to be writing or proto-writing. Text E of the rongorongo corpus, also known as Keiti, is one of two dozen known rongorongo texts, though it survives only in photographs and rubbings.

Other names
E is the standard designation, from Barthel (1958). Fischer (1997) refers to it as RR6.

Jaussen called it also vermoulue 'wormeaten'.

Location
Formerly in the library of the Catholic University of Leuven (Louvain), Belgium. Pinart published rubbings, which are kept in the Bancroft Library of the University of California, Berkeley.

Fischer (1997) says that the tablet survives in replicas made from casts. However, these replicas appear to have been of the Small Santiago; other than the rubbings, Keiti only survives in the two sets of photographs, one with white fill in the glyphs to make them more visible (Horley 2010).

Description
Destroyed during shelling of Leuven in 1914. Originally a fluted tablet of unknown wood, 39 × 13 cm, in beautiful condition but for some small wormholes esp. on recto, upper right side.

Provenance
One of Jaussen's tablets, Keiti was apparently collected on Easter Island by Fathers Roussel and Zumbohm in 1870 and sent to him in Tahiti. In 1888 Jaussen sent it to the headquarters of the Congrégation des Sacrés-Coeurs et de l'Adoration (SSCC) in Paris, with instructions to forward it to Charles-Joseph de Harlez de Deulin at the Catholic University at Louvain. It was sent in 1894, and stored in the university library, which was burnt down by the Germans in the siege of Louvain in 1914.

Content
This is one of the texts Metoro Taua Ure 'read' for Jaussen. However, he read the verso upside down, included the end of line 1 as part of line 2 and read it backwards, from right to left.

Text
Nine lines of glyphs recto, eight verso, for ~ 880 glyphs in all. Pozdniakov found a sequence of glyphs known from several other tablets that is split between lines Er9 and Ev1, confirming Barthel's reading order.

Line 3 of the recto terminates prematurely, with its end wedged between lines 2 and 4, as seen also on the verso of Aruku.

Barthel

Fischer

Image gallery

References
 BARTHEL, Thomas S. 1958. Grundlagen zur Entzifferung der Osterinselschrift (Bases for the Decipherment of the Easter Island Script). Hamburg : Cram, de Gruyter.
 FISCHER, Steven Roger. 1997. RongoRongo, the Easter Island Script: History, Traditions, Texts. Oxford and N.Y.: Oxford University Press.
 HORLEY, Paul. 2010. "Rongorongo tablet Keiti". Rapa Nui Journal 24.1:45–56.
 POZDNIAKOV, Konstantin. 1996. "Les Bases du Déchiffrement de l'Écriture de l'Ile de Pâques (The Bases of Deciphering the Writing of Easter Island)". Journal de la Société des Océanistes 103 (2): 289–303. 
 POZDNIAKOV, Konstantin. 2011. "Tablet Keiti and calendar-like structures in Rapanui script". (preprint)

External links
 Barthel's coding of text E
 Discovery of a copy of the photographs

Rongorongo inscriptions